West of Singapore is a 1933 American pre-Code
drama film directed by Albert Ray and starring Betty Compson, Weldon Heyburn and Margaret Lindsay.

Cast
 Betty Compson as Lou  
 Weldon Heyburn as Dan Manton  
 Margaret Lindsay as Shelby Worrell  
 Noel Madison as Degama  
 Tom Douglas as Glenn Worrell  
 Clyde Cook as Ricky  
 Harvey Clark as Scrub  
 Ernie Adams as Watson

References

Bibliography
 Doherty, Thomas. Pre-Code Hollywood: Sex, Immorality, and Insurrection in American Cinema, 1930-1934. Columbia University Press, 1999.

External links
 

1933 films
American adventure drama films
Films directed by Albert Ray
Monogram Pictures films
American black-and-white films
1930s adventure drama films
1933 drama films
1930s English-language films
1930s American films